Tuczempy  (Tsaryns’ke) is a village in the administrative district of Gmina Jarosław, within Jarosław County, Subcarpathian Voivodeship, in south-eastern Poland.

Literature 
 Tadeusz Słaby "Tuczempy. Anthology", Arka Ltd.., Świnoujście, Wrocław, 2009,

References

Tuczempy